This is a list of villages and settlements in Nasarawa State, Nigeria organised by local government area (LGA) and district/area (with postal codes also given).

By postal code

By electoral ward
Below is a list of polling units, including villages and schools, organised by electoral ward.

References

Nasarawa
Nasarawa State
Nassarawa Eggon 
Alizaga
Wumme
Edehu
Mada station
Galle
Arugbadu
Bakyano
Alogani